Charles Howard Lungren Jr. (June 23, 1896 – March 21, 1972) was an American football player.  He played college football for Swarthmore and professional football in the National Football League (NFL) as a back and end for the Rock Island Independents. He appeared in four NFL games, two as a starter, during the 1923 season.

References

1896 births
1972 deaths
Rock Island Independents players
Players of American football from Pennsylvania
Swarthmore Garnet Tide football players
Sportspeople from Delaware County, Pennsylvania